Stevica "Stevo" Ristić (born 23 May 1982) is a Macedonian-Serbian former football striker who played for the Macedonia national football team. He took Macedonian citizenship to be eligible for the national team.

Club career
He played for Jedinstvo Vršac in 2001–02 in FR Yugoslavia third level, and then with Mladost Lukićevo in Second League of FR Yugoslavia. Then, he moved, in 2003, to Macedonia to play with FK Sileks from Kratovo. He was the best striker in Makedonska 1. Liga over his first three seasons with them and his great form earned him a 250,000 Euros transfer to Jeonbuk Hyundai Motors in the South Korean K-League. His form in his inaugural K-League season earned him Player of the Year awards and has reportedly been targeted by the 2008 AFC Champion, the Japanese club Urawa Red Diamonds, for a rumored sum of 1.725 million Euros. Pohang Steelers agreed a player swap loaned with Shin Kwang-Hoon going in the opposite direction for two and a half years in 2008.

In August 2010, Ristić signed a three-year contract with Russian Premier League side Amkar Perm.

International career
He elected to play and made his senior debut for Macedonia in a February 2007 friendly match against Albania in which he immediately scored and has earned a total of 17 caps, scoring 1 goal. His final international was an October 2012 FIFA World Cup qualification match against Croatia.

International goals
Results list Macedonia's goal tally first.

Personal life
He is married and has two kids. His wife is Macedonian.

Honors
Sileks
Macedonian League Runner-up: 2003–04
Pohang Steelers
Korean FA Cup (1): 2008
League Cup (1): 2009
AFC Champions League (1): 2009
Bunyodkor
Uzbek Cup: 2010

References

External links
 
 
 Profile at MacedonianFootball 

 

1982 births
Living people
People from Vršac
Macedonian people of Serbian descent
Association football forwards
Serbian footballers
Macedonian footballers
North Macedonia international footballers
FK Sileks players
Jeonbuk Hyundai Motors players
Pohang Steelers players
FC Bunyodkor players
FC Amkar Perm players
Suwon Samsung Bluewings players
Shonan Bellmare players
Jeonnam Dragons players
FK Temnić players
Macedonian First Football League players
K League 1 players
Uzbekistan Super League players
Russian Premier League players
J1 League players
Macedonian expatriate footballers
Expatriate footballers in South Korea
Macedonian expatriate sportspeople in South Korea
Expatriate footballers in Uzbekistan
Macedonian expatriate sportspeople in Uzbekistan
Expatriate footballers in Russia
Macedonian expatriate sportspeople in Russia
Expatriate footballers in Japan
Macedonian expatriate sportspeople in Japan